Lou Young III (born October 19, 1991) is a former American football cornerback. He played college football at Georgia Tech.

Professional career

Denver Broncos
On May 12, 2014, Young was signed as an undrafted free agent by the Denver Broncos. On August 30, 2014, he was released by the Broncos.

Baltimore Ravens
On September 15, 2014, the Baltimore Ravens signed Young to their practice squad. On October 9, 2014, his practice squad contract was terminated by the Ravens.

Jacksonville Jaguars
On October 21, 2014, the Jacksonville Jaguars signed Young to their practice squad. On November 11, 2014, he was released by the Jaguars.

Carolina Panthers
On November 24, 2014, the Carolina Panthers signed Young to their practice squad. On January 13, 2015, he was signed to a reserve/future contract by the Panthers. On September 5, 2015, he was released by the Panthers. On September 7, 2015, Young was signed to the Panthers' practice squad. He was promoted to the active roster on January 5, 2016.

On February 7, 2016, Young's Panthers played in Super Bowl 50. He was inactive for the game as the Panthers fell to the Denver Broncos by a score of 24–10.

On September 3, 2016, Young was waived by the Panthers as part of final roster cuts. He was signed to the practice squad on October 12, 2016. He was promoted to the active roster on October 15, 2016. He was released on October 17, 2016. He was re-signed to the practice squad on November 3, 2016. He was promoted back to the active roster on November 25, 2016.

On May 2, 2017, Young was waived by the Panthers.

Washington Redskins
On June 7, 2017, Young was signed by the Washington Redskins. He was waived/injured by the Redskins on July 29, 2017, and placed on injured reserve. He was waived with an injury settlement on August 3, 2017.

Arizona Cardinals
On February 12, 2018, Young was signed by the Arizona Cardinals. On August 15, 2018, Young was waived by the Cardinals.

Atlanta Legends
Young joined the Alliance of American Football's Atlanta Legends, but failed to make the final roster.

References

External links
 Carolina Panthers bio

1991 births
Living people
African-American players of American football
Players of American football from Washington, D.C.
American football cornerbacks
Georgia Tech Yellow Jackets football players
Denver Broncos players
Baltimore Ravens players
Jacksonville Jaguars players
Carolina Panthers players
Washington Redskins players
Arizona Cardinals players
Atlanta Legends players
21st-century African-American sportspeople